Until Midnight is an Emirati thriller film. It is directed by Tariq Alkazim and produced by Yunjie Han. Ahmed Khamis Ali plays the lead role of Salem. The film was released in June 2018.

Plot 
Newly married Salem finds a stranger in his home who has malevolent plans.

Cast 
 Ahmed Khamis Ali as Salem
 Chuka Ekweogwu as Ronin
 Hiba Hamoui as Sarah
 Rik Aby as Hassan
 Marwan Ahmed as Abdulqader

Production 
The film is shot in Dubai in a villa at Al Barsha - Dubai, U.A.E

References 

 https://gulfnews.com/leisure/movies/features/emirati-horror-flick-brings-an-intruder-home-1.2238124
 https://www.akhbaralaan.net/entertainment/celebrities/2018/6/4/%D8%AD%D8%AA%D9%89-%D9%85%D9%86%D8%AA%D8%B5%D9%81-%D8%A7%D9%84%D9%84%D9%8A%D9%84-%D9%81%D9%8A%D9%84%D9%85-%D8%B1%D8%B9%D8%A8-%D9%85%D9%86-%D8%A7%D9%84%D8%A5%D9%85%D8%A7%D8%B1%D8%A7%D8%AA
http://www.adwonline.ae/uae-verge-film-revolution/

External links
 

2018 films
Emirati multilingual films
Emirati thriller films
2018 thriller films